Édouard-Zotique Massicotte, MRSC (24 December 1867 – 8 November 1947) was a Canadian historian, archivist, journalist, and literary critic.

Massicotte was elected to the Royal Society of Canada in 1920 and won its J. B. Tyrrell Historical Medal in 1939.

He was the brother of the illustrator Edmond-Joseph Massicotte.

References 

1867 births
1947 deaths
Canadian historians
Historians of Canada
Historians of Quebec
Fellows of the Royal Society of Canada
Canadian archivists
Canadian journalists
Canadian poets in French
Université Laval Faculté de droit alumni